Jack Shainman Gallery is a contemporary art gallery in New York City. The gallery was founded by Jack Shainman and Claude Simard (19562014) in 1984 in Washington, D.C. The gallery has a focus on artists from Africa, East Asia, and North America.

History
The gallery opened a  exhibition space called The School in Kinderhook, New York in 2018. In 2022, the gallery announced plans to open a  space at 108 Leonard.

Artists
The gallery represents numerous living artists, including:
 Nina Chanel Abney
 El Anatsui
 Shimon Attie
 Radcliffe Bailey
 Yoan Capote
 Nick Cave (since 2005)
 Geoffrey Chadsey
 Gehard Demetz
 Pierre Dorion
 Vibha Galhotra
 Kay Hassan
 Brad Kahlhamer
 Hayv Kahraman
 Anton Kannemeyer
 Tallur L.N.
 Deborah Luster
 Kerry James Marshall
 Enrique Martinez Celaya
 Meleko Mokgosi
 Richard Mosse
 Adi Nes
 Jackie Nickerson
 Odili Donald Odita
 Toyin Ojih Odutola
 Garnett Puett
 Claudette Schreuders
 Malick Sidibé
 Paul Anthony Smith
 Michael Snow
 Susana Solano
 Becky Suss
 Hank Willis Thomas
 Carlos Vega
 Leslie Wayne
 Carrie Mae Weems
 Lynette Yiadom-Boakye

In addition, the gallery manages various artist estates, including:
 Barkley L. Hendricks 
 Gordon Parks

References

External links

Art museums and galleries in New York City